Carrickfergus railway station serves the centre of Carrickfergus in County Antrim, Northern Ireland. In addition to this, Clipperstown serves the west of the town, and Downshire the east.

The station opened on 1 October 1862.

Service

Some peak time trains terminate here, at platform 3, and other peak trains continue to Larne Town.

On Saturdays, the service remains half-hourly, with fewer trains at peak times.

On Sundays, the service reduces to hourly operation in both directions.

References

Railway stations in County Antrim
Carrickfergus
Railway stations opened in 1862
Railway stations served by NI Railways
Grade B1 listed buildings
1862 establishments in Ireland
Railway stations in Northern Ireland opened in the 19th century